Zorro, The Gay Blade is a 1981 American swashbuckling comedy film from 20th Century Fox, produced by C.O. Erickson and George Hamilton, directed by Peter Medak, that stars Hamilton, Lauren Hutton, Ron Leibman, and Brenda Vaccaro.

The film's opening prologue states: "This film is dedicated to Rouben Mamoulian and the other great filmmakers whose past gives us our future".

The prologue quickly establishes that Zorro, The Gay Blade is a tongue-in-cheek sequel to 20th Century Fox's swashbuckling adventure film The Mark of Zorro (1940), directed by Mamoulian.

Hamilton was nominated for a Golden Globe award for playing the dual role of Don Diego de la Vega (Zorro) and his gay twin brother Bunny Wigglesworth, aka Ramón de la Vega.

Plot
In 1840s Madrid, Spain, Don Diego de la Vega is in bed with a married woman. They are caught by her husband, Garcia, and Diego must sword fight with him and his five brothers. During the altercation, Diego's mute servant Paco reads (via gestures) a letter from Diego's father ordering Diego's return to California. Diego and Paco jump from a high wall into a waiting carriage.

When the two arrive in Los Angeles months later, they are met by Diego's childhood friend Esteban, who is now capitán of the guard. He has married Florinda, for whom the men competed when they were boys. Diego learns that his father was killed in a riding accident, his horse "frightened by a turtle". Esteban is the acting alcalde until the Dons elect a replacement.

Esteban is elected by acclamation and then gives a speech to the assembled peasants. He is interrupted by Charlotte Taylor-Wilson, a wealthy political activist from Boston. She and Diego meet, and despite their political differences, Diego is smitten.

Diego is invited to a masked ball celebrating Esteban's elevation. He also receives his inheritance: Zorro's black cape, hat, and sword, along with a letter from his late father revealing that he was Zorro. That legacy now falls to Diego. He decides the masked ball is the perfect place to announce Zorro's return. On his way there, Zorro witnesses a peasant being extorted. He confronts and defeats Esteban's tax collector, then instructs the peasant to spread the word that El Zorro has returned.

Diego, in Zorro costume, dances with Florinda at the ball. Velasquez, the tax collector, reports the theft to Esteban, pointing to Diego as Zorro. A duel ensues with Esteban, and Zorro escapes by again jumping from a high wall, but this time injuring his foot and hobbling away.

Later that night, a drunken Florinda attempts to seduce Diego at his hacienda, but Esteban arrives to speak about the evening's events. He suspects that Diego might be Zorro, but Diego convinces him that his foot is uninjured.

A reign of terror begins, including torture and increased taxation. Diego is frustrated because, being injured, he cannot fight Esteban's tyranny. Fate intervenes when Diego's gay, foppish, and British-educated twin brother Ramón de la Vega, a Royal Navy officer having adopted the name "Bunny Wigglesworth", comes home for a visit. Diego brings him up to date, and Bunny assumes the guise of Zorro, using a whip instead of a sword, while wearing flamboyant Zorro attire in a variety of coordinated colors.

The colorful Zorro always eludes capture. Esteban hatches a plan to lure Zorro to the alcalde's residence with another ball to show off Florinda's expensive new necklace. Seeing through the plan, Diego arrives dressed as Zorro. So do the rest of the Dons and male party guests, saying that a message from Esteban instructed them all to dress that way. Adding to the confusion, Bunny appears in drag, masquerading as "Margarita" Wigglesworth, Diego's cousin from Santa Barbara. Esteban is smitten upon meeting her. Bunny spills a drink on Florinda, and in the resulting chaos attempts to clean her dress, and makes off with the necklace. As Bunny leaves to return to the Royal Navy, he tells Diego that Charlotte Taylor-Wilson has confessed her love for Zorro.

At the plaza, Diego (as Zorro) and Charlotte meet again, falling into each other's arms, but they are observed and Esteban is informed. As a ruse to lure Zorro, he has Charlotte arrested, and she is sentenced to be executed. Don Diego as Zorro surrenders to Esteban to save her, and he is sentenced to death.

Seconds before the firing squad opens fire, Bunny, this time wearing a bright metallic gold costume, announces the return of Zorro with a rhyme, "Two bits, four bits, six bits, a peso. All for Zorro, stand up and say so!" With Charlotte's and Diego's aid, Zorro incites the assembled peasants to rebellion. Esteban's guards also rebel, joined by Florinda, and Esteban stands alone, defeated. Later, Bunny finally rides off to catch his ship back to Britain, waving goodbye, after which Diego and Charlotte ride off to plan their wedding. As her wedding gift, Charlotte suggests that Diego donate all his family lands to the people, so they can settle down and raise a family in Boston.

Cast
 George Hamilton as Don Diego Vega / Zorro / Bunny Wigglesworth / Ramón Vega
 Lauren Hutton as Charlotte Taylor-Wilson
 Brenda Vaccaro as Florinda
 Ron Leibman as Captain Esteban
 Donovan Scott as Paco
 James Booth as Velasquez
 Helen Burns as Consuelo
 Clive Revill as Garcia
 Carolyn Seymour as Dolores
 Eduardo Noriega as Don Francisco
 Pilar Pellicer as Don Francisco's wife
 Jorge Russek as Don Fernando
 Eduardo Alcaraz as Don Jose
 Carlos Bravo y Fernández as Don Luis Obispo
 Roberto Dumont as Ferraro
 Jorge Bolio as Pablito
 Frank Welker as Narrator (in voice-over)

Development
The film began life as a screenplay by future screenwriter and teacher David Trottier, titled Zorro, the Comedy Adventure. Trottier had little involvement with the finished film, barring some minor additions, so was not credited.

Film score
The opening credits read: ”Music conducted and adapted by Ian Fraser” and the end credits: “Music adapted from The Adventures of Don Juan (1948) by Max Steiner [and] Danzes Fantastica by Joaquín Turina”.

Critical reception
Vincent Canby gave a mostly positive review in The New York Times, praising many of the performances in particular. "[George Hamilton] has energy and extreme good will. He also has surrounded himself with some very attractive and funny actors, particularly Mr. Leibman, Brenda Vaccaro, as the alcalde's sex-hungry wife, and beautiful Lauren Hutton".

References

External links

 
 
 
 

1981 films
1980s adventure comedy films
American parody films
1980s Western (genre) comedy films
20th Century Fox films
American adventure comedy films
American LGBT-related films
1981 LGBT-related films
1980s English-language films
Films directed by Peter Medak
1980s parody films
Zorro films
Films set in the 1840s
Films set in California
1981 comedy films
Films based on works by Johnston McCulley
Twins in fiction
1980s American films